This is a list of glaciers in Canada.

List of glaciers

Saint Elias Mountains
Donjek Glacier
Hubbard Glacier
Logan Glacier

Coast Mountains

Boundary Ranges
Juneau Icefield
Llewellyn Glacier
Hang Ten Icefield
Stikine Icecap
Great Glacier
Andrei Icefield
Andrei Glacier
Choquette Glacier
Hoodoo Glacier
Johnson Glacier
Porcupine Glacier
Twin Glacier
Salmon Glacier
Cambria Icefield

Pacific Ranges
Monarch Icefield
Ha-Iltzuk Icefield 
Klinaklini Glacier
Silverthrone Glacier
Waddington Massif-Pantheon Range-Whitemantle Range
Waddington Glacier
Tiedemann Glacier
Scimitar Glacier
Parallel Glacier
Franklin Glacier
Bell Glacier (Canada)
Cannonade Glacier
Remote Glacier
Shadow Glacier
Fan Glacier
Geddes Glacier
Chaos Glacier
Radiant Glacier
Cataract Glacier
Isolation Glacier
Shiverick Glacier
Malemute Glacier
Sunrise Glacier
Tellot Glacier
Smoking Cannon Glacier
Jambeau Glacier
Chanterelle Glacier
Yataghan Glacier
Jubilee Glacier
Chasm Glacier
Lemolo Glacier
Marvel Glacier
Splinter Glacier
Dauntless Glacier
Cascade Glacier
Whitemantle Glacier
Homathko Icefield
Lillooet Icecap 
Lord Glacier
Tchaikazan Glacier
Stanley Smith Glacier
Frank Smith Glacier
Bridge Glacier
Lillooet Glacier
Necwtinoaz Glacier
Magaera Glacier
Qwilqen Glacier
Stalhalam Glacier
Compton Névé
Ring Glacier
Pemberton Icefield
Overseer Icefield
Ipsoot Icefield
Powder Mountain Icefield
Rainbow Glacier
Plateau Icefield

Garibaldi Ranges
Armchair Glacier
Wedge Glacier 
Spearhead Glacier
Blackcomb Glacier
Overlord Glacier
Spearhead Glacier
Garibaldi Névé
Mamquam Icefield
Misty Icefield 
Stave Glacier
Snowcap Icefield

Lillooet Ranges
Joffre Glacier

Cayoosh Range
Place Glacier

Vancouver Island Ranges
Aureole Icefield
Comox Glacier

Columbia Mountains

Purcell Mountains
Bugaboo Glacier
Commander Glacier
Durrand Glacier
Farnham Glacier
Jumbo Glacier
Jumbo Glacier, British Columbia, a resort in the area.
Macbeth Icefield
Conrad Icefield

Selkirk Mountains
Caribou Glacier
Kokanee Glacier 
Illecillewaet Névé
Illecillewaet Glacier
Albert Icefield
Clachnacudainn Icefield
Gyr Icefield
Primrose Icefield
Bonney Névé
Deville Névé
Duncan Névé
Goldstream Névé
Sonata Névé
Van Horne Névé
Woodbury Glacier

Monashee Mountains
Serpentine Névé

Cariboo Mountains
Braithwaite Icefield

Interior Mountains

Hazelton Mountains
Silvertip Icefield

Canadian Rockies (BC/AB)
Angel Glacier – Jasper National Park, Alberta
Athabasca Glacier – Jasper National Park, Alberta
Berg Glacier – Mount Robson Provincial Park, British Columbia
Bonnet Icefield – Canadian Rockies
Bow Glacier – Banff National Park, Alberta
Campbell Icefield
Chaba Icefield – Canadian Rockies
Clemenceau Icefield – Canadian Rockies
Columbia Icefield – Canadian Rockies
Crowfoot Glacier – Banff National Park, Alberta
Daly Glacier – Yoho National Park, British Columbia
Dome Glacier – Jasper National Park, Alberta
Drummond Icefield – Canadian Rockies
Emerald Glacier – Yoho National Park, British Columbia
Freshfield Icefield – Canadian Rockies
Hooker Icefield
Lloyd George Icefield – Northern Rockies
Lyell Icefield
Mons Icefield
Mount Brown Icefield
Hector Glacier – Banff National Park, Alberta
Peyto Glacier – Banff National Park, Alberta 
Ram Glacier – Banff National Park, Alberta
Reef Icefield
Robson Glacier – Mount Robson Provincial Park, British Columbia
Saskatchewan Glacier – Banff National Park, Alberta
Vulture Glacier – Banff National Park, Alberta
Wapta Icefield – Banff National Park, Alberta
Waputik Icefield – Banff National Park, Alberta
Washmanwapta Icefield
Yoho Glacier – Yoho National Park, British Columbia

Arctic Archipelago

Axel Heiberg Island
Müller Icecap
White Glacier

Baffin Island
Barnes Ice Cap
Coronation Glacier
Jimi Maasi Glacier
Keyhole Glacier
Kiitarayuk Glacier
Macculloch Glacier
Nuuksuq Glacier
Oliver Glacier
Penny Ice Cap
Utinatuk Glacier
West Pioneer Glacier

Bylot Island
Kaparoqtalik Glacier
Sermilik Glacier

Devon Island
Devon Ice Cap

Ellesmere Island
Agassiz Ice Cap
Benedict Glacier
Chapman Glacier
Disraeli Glacier
Eugenie Glacier
Grant Ice Cap
Parrish Glacier
Sven Hedin Glacier
Turnabout Glacier

Melville Island
Melville South Icecap

See also
List of glaciers

References

 
Canada
Glaciers